This list of tallest buildings in Xiamen ranks skyscrapers in the southeastern coastal city of Xiamen, China by height. Xiamen is sub-provincial city under Fujian province it became one of China's earliest Special Economic Zones in the 1980s. The tallest building in Xiamen is currently Xiamen International Centre which rises 339.88 m.

Tallest buildings
This includes spires and architectural details but does not include antenna masts.

Tallest under construction, approved, and proposed

Under construction
This lists buildings that are under construction in Xiamen and are planned to rise at least .

Timeline of tallest buildings 
This lists buildings that once held the title of tallest building in Xiamen.

References

External links
  Xiamen Skyscrapers on Skycraperpage.com 
 Xiamen Skyscrapers on Emporis.com
 Skyscrapers of Xiamen on Gaoloumi (in Chinese)

Buildings and structures in Xiamen
Xiamen
Skyscrapers in Xiamen